Goncagül Sunar (born 17 September 1970) is a Turkish  theater, cinema and TV series actress and musician.

Sunar was born in Istanbul. She started her artistic career in 1991. She won Best Short Screenplay Award at Flying Broom International Women's Film Festival.

Filmography

References

External links 
 

20th-century Turkish actresses
Living people
1970 births
Actresses from Istanbul
Turkish stage actresses
Turkish film actresses
Turkish television actresses
21st-century Turkish actresses
21st-century Turkish women singers